St. Maria Lyskirchen is one of twelve Romanesque churches in Cologne, Germany.

History
St. Maria Lyskirchen is the smallest of the twelve Romanesque churches in Cologne.  It was founded in 948,  and the present building dates from 1210 to 1220, with some later additions in the Gothic style. The upper parts of the west front were rebuilt in the 19th century. The church is in the form of a three-aisled basilica, with a chancel flanked by two towers, only one of which was constructed to its full height, and an eastern apse. The building received only minor damage during the wars.

The church has a sculptured Romanesque portal, and a cycle of 13th century ceiling paintings. Rediscovered in the 19th century, they are unique in Cologne and show stories from the Old and New Testaments. The church contains the "Schiffermadonna" (Seaman's Madonna), a wooden statue of 1420. A triptych by Joos van Cleve, with a central panel of the Lamentation, was sold in 1812; a few years later it was replaced with a copy by  Benedikt Beckenkamp, which remains in the church.

Gallery

See also
 Twelve Romanesque churches of Cologne
 Cologne Cathedral 
 German architecture
 Romanesque architecture
 List of regional characteristics of Romanesque churches 
 Romanesque secular and domestic architecture

References

Further reading
 Hiltrud Kier: Via Sacra zu Fuß, Kölns Städtebau und die Romanischen Kirchen. Bachem Verlag, Köln 2003 (²/2005) .
 Ulrich Krings, Otmar Schwab: Köln: Die Romanischen Kirchen – Zerstörung und Wiederherstellung. Reihe Stadtspuren Bd. 2, Köln, Bachem Verlag, 2007 (712 S. mit CD Chronologie des Wiederaufbaus).
 Sybille Fraquelli: Zwölf Tore zum Himmel. Kinder entdecken: Die Romanischen Kirchen in Köln. J.P. Bachem Verlag, Köln 2007. 
 Hiltrud Kier und Ulrich Krings: Die Romanischen Kirchen in Köln, Köln, 3.Auflage 1986.
 Sabine Czymmek: Die Kölner Romanischen Kirchen, Schatzkunst, Bd. 1, Köln 2008, Bd. 2, Köln 2009 (= Colonia Romanica, Jahrbuch des Fördervereins Romanische Kirchen Köln e. V. Bd. 22, 2007 und 23, 2008)

External links 

 Förderverein Romanische Kirchen Köln e.V. 
 Romanesque churches of Cologne on Sacred Destinations 
 Romanesque churches on Cologne-Tourism 

Tourist attractions in Cologne
Innenstadt, Cologne

Cologne